The Rush Creek Covered Bridge is south of Tangier, Indiana.  The single span Burr Arch covered bridge structure was built by William Hendricks in 1904.

It was added to the National Register of Historic Places in 1978.

History
This is the first of three bridges that would be built by William Hendricks. The other two are Wilkins Mill Covered Bridge, 1906, and Mill Creek Covered Bridge, 1907. All three are of similar construction with very shallow portals.

Gallery

See also
 List of Registered Historic Places in Indiana
 Parke County Covered Bridges
 Parke County Covered Bridge Festival

References

Covered bridges on the National Register of Historic Places in Parke County, Indiana
Bridges completed in 1904
Wooden bridges in Indiana
Burr Truss bridges in the United States